The Massimiliano Massimo Institute (Istituto Massimiliano Massimo) is a Jesuit school in Rome. It is considered one of the most prestigious and exclusive schools in Rome. The school, with over 10,000 former students, has one of the most prestigious alumni registries in Italy.

History
Its roots are in the School of Grammar, Humanities and Christian Doctrine, a small school set up in Via Nuova Capitolina (now Via dell'Aracœli) by Ignatius Loyola in 1551. That school proved a success and so pope Gregory XIII ordered the construction of a larger institution, which opened on 28 October 1584 as the Roman College. In this and other Jesuit colleges was written the 1559 Ratio Studiorum, a document which is still the basis of the teaching methods in Jesuit schools. Those methods were followed in the Roman College until the Jesuits' suppression in 1773 and was restored with the order in 1814 by Pope Pius VII.

In 1870 the Italian government confiscated the building for the Ennio Quirino Visconti Liceo Ginnasio, with the College's professors and students moving to the nearby palazzo Borromeo until the Pontifical Gregorian University was built to take its university students. However, in 1873, Father Massimiliano Massimo (after whom the institute is named) inherited the Palazzo Peretti and, in 1879, made it available to the Jesuits for the re-foundation of a school to continue the Roman College's work in secondary education. In 1960, due to a rise in student numbers, the Institute was transferred from Terme (near the Stazione Termini) to EUR, where it now stands. It stands out from the skyline at EUR thanks to the odd shape of its church and its position on the highest point of the EUR pentagon. In 1973 it was allowed to enroll its first set of female students and in 1987 all its classes were made co-ed.

The institute participates in many sports, both in the schools league and the sports associations, such as hockey, long jump, athletics, weightlifting, racing, and basketball. It is also the headquarters of the Student Missionary League, a Jesuit movement for the spiritual training of secondary students, organising meetings and work camps in preparation for confirmation of those in and above their third year at secondary school.

Notable alumni
      
Luigi Abete
Luca Cordero di Montezemolo  
Mario Draghi
Ettore Majorana
Giancarlo Abete
Giancarlo Magalli

Gianni De Gennaro 
Giorgio Barberio Corsetti
Pier Luigi Nervi
Carolina Crescentini
Giancarlo Buono
 
Each year the school's Alumni Association awards a prize to an alumnus who has shown particular distinction in their professional, cultural, or social life and maintained their relationship with the Institute and the Society of Jesus, or to a staff-member of the Society or Institute distinguished for their activity in teaching.

See also
 List of Jesuit sites

References

External links 
Official site
Official alumni site
 Notable alumni

Secondary schools in Italy
Schools in Rome
Catholic universities and colleges in Italy
Jesuit universities and colleges
Educational institutions established in the 1550s
Rome Q. XXXII Europa
1551 establishments in the Papal States